The following are the association football events of the year 1999 throughout the world.

Events
Manchester United won the UEFA Champions League, FA Cup and Premiership to cap off an unprecedented European Treble, the first (and, to date, only) English side to do so.
1999 Copa Libertadores: Won by Palmeiras after defeating Deportivo Cali 4–3 on a penalty shootout after a final aggregate score of 2–2.
FIFA Women's World Cup – United States won 0–0, 5–4 on penalty kicks, over China
Confederations Cup – Mexico won the tournament after beating Brazil 4–3
March 14 – New J.League Division 2 (J2) season started with ten clubs, one relegated from previous season's J.League and nine promoted from former Japan Football League.
May 22 – Manchester United wins the FA Cup with a 2–0 win over Newcastle United. The goals are scored by Teddy Sheringham and Paul Scholes.
August 8 – Feyenoord wins the Johan Cruyff Shield, the annual opening of the new season in the Eredivisie, by a 3–2 win over Ajax at the Amsterdam Arena.
September 11 – Manager Hans Meyer from Germany resigns at Dutch club Twente, and is replaced by former player Fred Rutten.
October 27 – Dutch club Sparta Rotterdam fires manager Jan Everse, who is replaced by Dolf Roks.
October 30 – Manager Herbert Neumann is fired at Dutch club Vitesse. Ronald Koeman will replace him on 1 January 2000. In the meantime former player Edward Sturing takes control.
November 5 – Italy's Veneto wins the first UEFA Regions' Cup, beating Spain's Madrid 3–2, after extra time, in Abano Terme.
November 30 – Manchester United wins the Intercontinental Cup in Tokyo by defeating Brazil's Palmeiras: 1–0. The only goal for the English club is scored by Roy Keane in the 35th minute.
December 29 – Manager Jimmy Calderwood leaves Dutch club NEC and is succeeded by former player Ron de Groot.

Winners national club championship

Asia
AFC Champions League
1998-99 Winner: Japan - Júbilo Iwata  Runners Up: Iran - Esteghlal

Europe
  – Croatia Zagreb
  – Sparta Prague
  – Manchester United
  - Haka Valkeakoski
  – Bordeaux
  – Bayern Munich
  – KR
  – A.C. Milan
 
 Eredivisie – Feyenoord
 Eerste Divisie – Den Bosch
  – Porto
  – Rangers
  – Barcelona
  – Galatasaray
  – Partizan

North America
 – Toronto Olympians (CPSL)

Verano – Toluca
Invierno – Pachuca
 – D.C. United (MLS)

South America
 Argentina
Clausura – Boca Juniors
Apertura – River Plate
 Bolivia – Blooming
 Brazil – Corinthians
 Chile – Universidad de Chile
 Ecuador – LDU Quito
 Paraguay – Olimpia Asunción
 Peru – Universitario de Deportes

International tournaments
 UNCAF Nations Cup in San José, Costa Rica (March 17–28, 1999)
 
 
 
 Canada Cup in Edmonton, Alberta, Canada (June 2–6, 1999)
 
 
 
 Copa América in Paraguay (June 29 – July 18, 1999)
 
 
 
 Pan American Games in Winnipeg, Manitoba, Canada (July 23 – August 7, 1999)
Men's Tournament
 
 
 
Women's Tournament
 
 
 
 FIFA U-20 World Cup in Nigeria (April 3–24, 1999)
 
 
 
 FIFA U-17 World Championship in New Zealand (November 10–27, 1999)

National team results

Europe



South America







Movies
Soccer Dog: The Movie (US)
There's Only One Jimmy Grimble (UK)

Births

 1 January: Gianluca Scamacca, Italian footballer
 5 January: Mattias Svanberg, Swedish footballer
 9 January: Maximiliano Romero, Argentinian footballer
 16 January: Joe White, English footballer
 19 January:
 Donyell Malen, Dutch footballer
 Valentino Müller, Austrian footballer
 23 January: 
Alban Lafont, French footballer
 Malang Sarr, French footballer
 24 January: Shan Huanhuan, Chinese footballer
 4 February: Mohammad Soltani Mehr, Iranian footballer
 17 February: Oscar Krusnell, Swedish footballer 
 25 February: Gianluigi Donnarumma, Italian international goalkeeper
 18 March: Diogo Dalot, Portuguese international footballer
 29 March: Ezequiel Barco, Argentinian footballer
 31 March: Jens Odgaard, Danish footballer
 14 April: Matteo Guendouzi, French footballer
 24 April: Jonathan Leko, English footballer
 25 May: Ibrahima Konaté, French footballer
 3 June: Dan-Axel Zagadou, French footballer
 10 June: Rafael Leão, Portuguese footballer
 11 June: Kai Havertz, German international
 23 June: 
 Linton Maina, German footballer
 24 June: Darwin Núñez, Uruguayan international
 2 July: Nicolò Zaniolo, Italian international
 17 July: Stahl Gubag, Papua New Guinean international 
 3 August: Brahim Díaz, Spanish footballer
 12 August: Matthijs de Ligt, Dutch international 
 5 October: Connor McLennan, Scottish youth international
 15 October: Ben Woodburn, Welsh international
 10 November: João Félix, Portuguese international
 18 November: Domingos Quina, Portuguese footballer
 4 December: Tahith Chong, Dutch footballer
 10 December: Reiss Nelson, English footballer

Deaths

January
 January 6 – Ottavio Misefari (89), Italian footballer
 January 6 – Lajos Tichy (63), Hungarian footballer
 January 18 – Horace Cumner (80), Welsh footballer

March
 March 30 – Igor Netto (69), Soviet footballer

April
 April 28 – Sir Alfred Ramsey (79), English footballer and manager

July
 July 20– Abderrahmane Boubekeur, Algerian goalkeeper, former player of AS Monaco FC, the FLN football team and the Algeria national football team. (68)
 July 28 – Carlos Romero, Uruguayan forward, winner of the 1950 FIFA World Cup. (71)

August
 August 23 – Georges Boulogne (81), French footballer

November
 November 14 – Bert Jacobs (58), Dutch footballer and manager

References

 
Association football by year